The 20×138mmB or Long Solothurn cartridge is a type of ammunition used mainly for anti-aircraft and anti-tank weapons during World War II. The designation means the caliber is 20 mm, the length of the cartridge case is 138 mm and B indicates it is a belted case. The loaded cartridge weighs .

History 

The 20×138mmB cartridge was initially created by the Swiss Solothurn company in the early 1930s.

Weapon platforms 

The 20×138mmB cartridge is used in the following weapons:

Switzerland 

 Solothurn anti-tank rifles: S-18/1000 and S-18/1100
Solothurn ST-5 20mm AA Gun

Germany 

 FlaK 30 and FlaK 38 single-barrel, and Flakvierling quadruple-barrel anti-aircraft guns
 KwK 30 and KwK 38 vehicle-mounted weapons
 MG C/30L aircraft gun

Italy 

 Cannone-Mitragliera da 20/65 modello 35 (Breda) 
 Cannone-Mitragliera da 20/77 (Scotti)

Finland 

 Lahti L-39 anti-tank rifle
 Lahti L-40 anti-aircraft gun

Poland 

 Nkm wz.38 FK anti-tank vehicle-mounted gun

References

Large-caliber cartridges
20 mm artillery
Military equipment introduced in the 1930s